Giulia Pollini (born 8 March 1988) is an Italian lightweight rower twice bronze medal winner at senior level at the World Rowing Championships.

Achievements

References

External links
 
 Giulia Pollini at Italian Rowing Federation

1988 births
Living people
Italian female rowers
World Rowing Championships medalists for Italy